Babatte is a village in the Bignona Department  of the Ziguinchor Region of Senegal. It has a population of 348 people according to the 2002 census.

References

Populated places in the Bignona Department
Arrondissement of Tenghory